Jens Schou Fabricius (3 March 1758 – 6 April 1841) was the Norwegian appointed Minister of the Navy 1817–1818. He served as a representative for Søe-Deffensionen at the Norwegian Constitutional Assembly at Eidsvoll in 1814. During his naval career he served first the Danish Crown until the separation in 1814 of Norway from Denmark, and thereafter the Norwegian-Swedish Crown. Fabricius retired from the navy as a vice admiral.

Background
Jens Schou Fabricius was born in  Larvik, Norway. He was the son of District Judge Laurs Sørensen Fabricius (1695-1761). Jens Schou Fabriciu was a student at the Royal Danish Naval Academy in Copenhagen from the age of eleven.

Danish service
He became  a junior lieutenant on 20 December 1779. He was promoted to senior lieutenant on 25 January 1788. to lieutenant-commander on 13 November 1789 and to captain on 31 May 1799.

1781–1787
He was Ekvipagemester (Head of Naval Stores) for the Danish company trading from the Baltic to Guinea in West Africa from 1781 to 1787, during which time he journeyed to the Mediterranean Sea with the warship Oldenborg and to China as first mate on the Charlotte Amalie.

1788–1799
He saw service in the frigate Store Belt which, in 1788, was a cadet training ship, as second-in-command of the frigate Alsen when she was acting as guard-ship in the Øresund, and as captain of the smaller Speideren in the home squadron.   In October 1788 he became deputy ekvipagemester at Fredriksvern in Vestfold and in the following years was often away on tours of duties with various ships, as captain.

In 1795 Fabricius sailed to the Danish West Indies, but he could not tolerate the climate and was sent home by his senior officer.  In 1797 he sailed as captain of the brig Lougen which was part of a squadron destined for the Mediterranean Sea.  On the outward journey his ship broached in a storm in the North Sea but righted herself with four feet of water in the hold and in the cabins.  Fabricius and Lougen returned to Copenhagen on 6 August 1799.

1800–1809
After a period as second-in-command of the warship Danmark in the home squadron, and some sick leave, Fabricius was appointed in  October 1801 as commander of the port and fortress at Fredriksvern, including the Norwegian flotilla of small gunboats.  With the outbreak of hostilities between Denmark and Britain, he became a member of the commission responsible for planning Norway’s maritime defences.

1810–1814
In 1810 his duties at Fredriksvern were reduced whilst he still retained command together with the directorships of the church, school, pilotage and quarantine departments.  In 1812 Fabricius sought a transfer to another position where he could better do his best, but this achieved little.

On 1 March 1814 he resigned from his Danish war duties.

Norwegian service
1814–1824
On 13 April 1814 Fabricius’ name was deleted from the list of Danish naval officers as he had sworn loyalty to the Norwegian government without having obtained a release from Denmark.

On 19 February 1816, Danish Captain Carl Adolph Rothe, Copenhagen's harbour master, arrived in Christiana (now Oslo) to negotiate with Norway’s  Thomas Fasting, Norwegian temporary Councillor of State, the return of the seven warbrigs that had ended up in Norwegian waters after the Treaty of Kiel.   The negotiations were taken up by his Norwegian counterpart the (now) rear admiral, Admiral Jens Schou Fabricius, who did not dispute the Danish king's right to five of the brigs, but proposed consideration of the feeling in Norway whether the affair could be settled by Norway paying suitable compensation for keeping the ships.  On 22 June agreement was reached between Fabricius and Rothe.  The brigs Allart and Seagull  which had been captured in Norwegian waters were awarded to the Norwegian navy. The other five brigs that were already in Norway would stay there on payment of 95,000 speciedlr (a little over $2 million US dollars bullion value in 2012).  Thomas Fasting, then Minister for Maritime Affairs (marinesaker), was succeeded by Jens Fabricius for the period 1817-1818, then Fasting took over again.
 
In 1818, Fabricius became adjutant general to Charles XIV John, King of Sweden and Norway and was promoted to vice admiral on 23 August 1821.  He was elected to the Norwegian Parliament in 1824 as a representative for Bratsberg (now Telemark).

Later
He retired, at the age of 78, in 1836 and died in Porsgrunn on 6 April 1841.

Notes

Primary Source
Translated from the Norwegian (Norsk bokmål) Wikipedia article Jens Fabricius

References

Other sources
Topsøe-Jensen, T. A. and Emil Marquard (1935) Officerer i den dansk-norske Søetat 1660-1814 og den danske Søetat 1814-1932 (Copenhagen: H. Hagerups Boghandel)
Holme Jørn (2014) De kom fra alle kanter - Eidsvollsmennene og deres hus  (Oslo: Cappelen Damm)

External links
Representantene på Eidsvoll 1814 (Cappelen Damm AS)
 Men of Eidsvoll (eidsvollsmenn)

1758 births
1841 deaths
People from Larvik
Royal Dano-Norwegian Navy personnel
Norwegian military personnel of the Napoleonic Wars
Government ministers of Norway
Presidents of the Storting
Fathers of the Constitution of Norway
Royal Norwegian Navy admirals